Casteel is a surname. Notable people with the surname include:

Jeff Casteel (date of birth missing), American football coach
Joshua Casteel (1979–2012), American soldier, conscientious objector, and playwright
Heaven Casteel, fictional character in V. C. Andrews novels
Homer Casteel (1879-1958), American politician
Homer Casteel Jr. (d. 1972), American painter, sculptor, writer and teacher
Miles W. Casteel (1895–1977), American football coach

See also
Casteels, another surname